EF Education–TIBCO–SVB is a women's professional cycling team based in the United States that competes in elite road bicycle racing. The team's main sponsors are TIBCO Software, Silicon Valley Bank and EF Education First. The owner is Linda Jackson, a former professional cyclist.

Team history
Team EF Education-TIBCO-SVB is the longest running women's professional cycling team in North America and traces its roots back to the Palo Alto Bicycles Women's (PABW) team. The team was created by Stanford MBA and investment banker, Linda Jackson. Jackson left investment banking in the early 90s to pursue her dream of becoming an Olympian. After becoming Canada's National Champion in 1995, Jackson was selected to represent Canada in the time trial and road race at the 1996 Atlanta Games. She went on to win the bronze medal at the 1996 World Championship Road Race in Lugano, Switzerland and accumulated numerous Canadian national championship titles in the road race and time trial. Cycling gave Jackson so much personally, that when she retired from the sport, she knew she wanted to help other women pursue their cycling aspirations.

Jackson became involved with PABW on a coaching basis in 2004, directed the team in 2005 and then added TIBCO as a sponsor in 2005 in order to help the team grow from a local racing team to a national-level team. Racing as PABW powered by TIBCO in 2006, the team finished the year ranked 36th overall in North America, up from 60th overall the year before. The following year, Jackson added Silicon Valley Bank as a sponsor. Jackson also created the Silicon Valley Cycling Foundation; a 501c3 formed to help develop promising female cyclists into top international competitors. The team soon rose to the top of the North American peloton and then began an expansion into International racing.

In 2008, the Team won both the National Road Race and Criterium (Brooke Miller) and was ranked 4th overall in North America. In 2009, the team became the top team in North America, won the National Road Race (Meredith Miller) and was named Team of the Year by VeloNews. In 2010, the team expanded to racing in Europe. In 2012, Team TIBCO won the National Road Race for the third time in five years with Megan Guarnier. In 2013 and 2014 the team repeated as the top team in North America. In 2015 Silicon Valley Bank became a co-title sponsor and the team added significantly more international events to its race calendar.

In 2017, the Team added four more National Championships to its tally with both Íngrid Drexel (Mexico) and Nicolle Bruderer (Guatemala) scoring double wins in the road race and time trial. 2018 started off with yet another national championship win; this time with new recruit Shannon Malseed winning the Australia National championship road race. In 2019, the team won the Australian national road race championship again, this time with new recruit Sarah Gigante. In 2020, Gigante won another national championship title, this time winning the Australian national time trial championships.

In 2022, the team joined the UCI Women's World Tour and became known as EF Education-TIBCO-SVB. During that season, Emma Langley secured overall victory in the 2022 Joe Martin Stage Race after winning the stage 3 time trial, and the team successfully defending the jersey through the final day's criterium stage.

Team roster

Major wins

2008
 United States National Road Race Championships, Brooke Miller
2009
 United States National Road Race Championships, Meredith Miller
2010
Sprints classification Tour de l'Aude Cycliste Féminin, Brooke Miller
Stage 4 Cascade Cycling Classic, Jo Kiesanowski
Stage 2 Tour Cycliste Féminin International de l'Ardèche, Ruth Corset
Gloucester Cyclo-cross, Meredith Miller
Providence Cyclo-cross, Meredith Miller
Iowa City Cyclo-cross, Meredith Miller
Iowa City Cyclo-cross, Amanda Miller
2011
Overall UCI Track World Cup (Beijing) Omnium, Tara Whitten
Individual Pursuit, Tara Whitten
Overall Giro della Toscana Int. Femminile – Memorial Michela Fanini, Megan Guarnier
Iowa City Cyclo-cross, Meredith Miller
Iowa City Cyclo-cross, Meredith Miller
Los Angeles Cyclo-cross, Meredith Miller
Los Angeles Cyclo-cross, Meredith Miller
2012
Prologue The Exergy Tour, Tara Whitten
2013
Overall Joe Martin Stage Race, Claudia Häusler
Prologue, Claudia Häusler
Stage 6 Nature Valley Grand Prix, Claudia Häusler
Stage 1 Cascade Cycling Classic, Claudia Häusler
Chrono Gatineau, Shelley Olds
Madison Cup (Points race), Rushlee Buchanan
Challenge International sur piste (Points race), Jasmin Glaesser
Challenge International sur piste (Scratch), Rushlee Buchanan
Overall Giro della Toscana Int. Femminile – Memorial Michela Fanini, Claudia Häusler
Saint Louis Cyclo-cross, Amanda Miller
2014
Tour of America's Dairyland – Giro d'Grafton, Samantha Schneider
Overall Cascade Cycling Classic, Lauren Stephens
Mountains classification, Andrea Dvorak
Prologue, Stages 1 & 2, Lauren Stephens
Stage 3, Kristabel Doebel-Hickok
Stage 4, Jo Kiesanowski
2015
Stage 4 (ITT) Tour Femenino de San Luis, Lauren Stephens
 Mountains classification Women's Tour of New Zealand, Joanne Hogan
 Overall Joe Martin Stage Race, Lauren Stephens
Stage 1 (ITT), Lauren Stephens
Stage 3 (ITT) Tour of the Gila, Lauren Stephens
 Points classification Tour de Feminin-O cenu Českého Švýcarska, Lauren Stephens
Stage 5, Kristabel Doebel-Hickok
Stage 2 Tour Cycliste Féminin International de l'Ardèche, Lauren Stephens
Stage 5 Tour Cycliste Féminin International de l'Ardèche, Kristabel Doebel-Hickok
2016
Stage 4 (ITT) Tour Femenino de San Luis, Lauren Stephens
Stage 4 Joe Martin Stage Race, Lauren Stephens
2017
Stage 2 Tour of the Gila, Lex Albrecht
Chrono Gatineau, Lauren Stephens
Winston-Salem Cycling Classic, Lauren Stephens
Stage 2 Thüringen Rundfahrt der Frauen, Lex Albrecht
Stage 4 (ITT) Thüringen Rundfahrt der Frauen, Lauren Stephens
 Combativity award Stage 5 Tour Cycliste Féminin International de l'Ardèche, Lex Albrecht
2018
Stage 5 Redlands Bicycle Classic, Emma Grant
Stage 3 Valley of the Sun Stage Race, Kendall Ryan
Stage 1 Tour of California, Kendall Ryan
Overall Armed Forces Association Cycling Classic, Kendall Ryan
Clarendon Cup, Kendall Ryan
2019
Stage 2 Joe Martin Stage Race, Shannon Malseed
 Overall Tour of the Gila, Brodie Chapman
Stages 1 & 5, Brodie Chapman
White Spot / Delta Road Race, Alison Jackson
Stage 2 Tour de Feminin-O cenu Českého Švýcarska, Brodie Chapman
Stage 2 Women's Tour of Scotland, Alison Jackson
2020
Overall Tour Cycliste Féminin International de l'Ardèche, Lauren Stephens
Points classification, Lauren Stephens
Stage 4, Kristen Faulkner
2021
Stage 1 Ladies Tour of Norway, Kristen Faulkner
Stages 2 & 3 (ITT) Joe Martin Stage Race, Emma Langley
2022
 Mountains classification Tour of the Gila Kristabel Doebel-Hickok
Team classification
Stages 1 & 3 (ITT), Kristabel Doebel-Hickok
Stage 2 Grand Prix Elsy Jacobs, Veronica Ewers
 Overall 2022 Joe Martin Stage Race, Emma Langley
Stage 3 (ITT), Emma Langley
Clasica Femenina Navarra, Veronica Ewers

National and world champions

2008
 USA Road Race, Brooke Miller
2009
 USA Road Race, Meredith Miller
2010
 Australia Road Race, Ruth Corset
2011
 World Track (Omnium), Tara Whitten
 Canada Track (Omnium), Tara Whitten
2012
 USA Road Race, Megan Guarnier
 USA Track (Pursuit), Lauren Hall
2015
 USA Criterium, Kendall Ryan
2017
 Mexican Road Race, Íngrid Drexel
 Mexican Time Trial, Íngrid Drexel
 Guatemala Time Trial, Nicolle Bruderer
 Guatemala Road Race, Nicolle Bruderer
2018
 Australia Road Race, Shannon Malseed
 Guatemala Time Trial, Nicolle Bruderer
 Mexican Time Trial, Íngrid Drexel
 Oceania Road Race, Sharlotte Lucas
2019
 Oceania Road Race, Sharlotte Lucas
2020
 Australia Time Trial, Sarah Gigante
2021
 Australia Time Trial, Sarah Gigante
 USA Road Race, Lauren Stephens
 USA Cyclo-cross, Clara Honsinger
2022
 Israel Time Trial, Omer Shapira
 Israel Road Race, Omer Shapira
 USA Road Race, Emma Langley

References

External links
 

UCI Women's Teams
Cycling teams based in the United States
Women's sports teams in the United States
Cycling teams established in 2006
2006 establishments in California